Centre for Urdu Language, Literature & Culture is a Urdu language institute located at Maulana Azad National Urdu University, Hyderabad, Telangana.

References

External links 
 Official site

Universities and colleges in Hyderabad, India
Urdu in India
Language education in India
2007 establishments in Andhra Pradesh
Educational institutions established in 2007